Zareh Moskofian (1898 in Izmit, Ottoman Empire – 1987 in Lyon, France ) was an Ottoman painter of Armenian descent.

Life 
Of Armenian descent, Moskofian was born in Izmit. He attended the local Armenian school. Upon returning from a trip to Aleppo, Moskofian began painting. He started with painting the scenery of Constantinople. He then moved to Lyon, France. In France, Moskofian continued his career in the arts and became a teacher. He died in 1987. He is also noted that during World War II, Moskofian gave refuge and shelter to Jews escaping the Holocaust.

References 

20th-century painters from the Ottoman Empire
Armenian painters
20th-century French painters
French male painters
People from İzmit
Armenians from the Ottoman Empire
People who rescued Jews during the Holocaust
1898 births
1987 deaths
Ethnic Armenian painters
Emigrants from the Ottoman Empire to France